Lysipomia vitreola is a species of flowering plant in the family Campanulaceae. It is endemic to the Azuay Province of Ecuador, where it grows in páramo habitat in the Andes. There are three known subpopulations.

References

vitreola
Endemic flora of Ecuador
Endangered plants
Páramo flora
Taxonomy articles created by Polbot